Frederick Bernard, Count Palatine of Gelnhausen (28 May 1697 in Gelnhausen – 5 August 1739, ibid.) was Count Palatine and Duke of Birkenfeld-Gelnhausen.

Life 
Frederick Bernard was the eldest son of the Duke and Count Palatine John Charles of Gelnhausen (1638-1704) from his second marriage, Esther Maria (1665-1725), the daughter of Baron George Frederick of Witzleben-Elgersburg.

In 1704, he succeeded his father as Count Palatine of Birkenfeld-Gelnhausen. He served in the French army as a colonel of the Royal Alsatian regiment. He was a knight of the  Order of Saint Hubert.

Frederick Bernard died in 1739 without a male heir.  Gelnhause was inherited by his younger brother John.

Marriage and issue 
Frederick Bernard married on 30 May 1737 in Arolsen to Ernestine Louise (1705-1782), the daughter of prince Frederick Anton Ulrich of Waldeck and Pyrmont.  Her mother was Frederick Bernard's cousin Louise of Palatinate-Birkenfeld-Bischweiler.  Frederick Bernard and Ernestine Louise had two daughters:
 Caroline Louise (1738-1782)
 Ernestine Friederike Auguste (1739-1746)

Ancestors

References 
 Johann Samuel Ersch: Allgemeine Encyklopädie der Wissenschaften und Künste. Section 2, H–N, part 21, Johann (Infant von Castilien) – Johann-Boniten, p. 189
 Maximilian V. Sattler: Lehrbuch der bayerischen Geschichte, Lindauer, 1868, p. 412
 Carl Renatus Hausen: Abhandlungen und Materialien zum neuesten deutschen Staatsrechte und Reichsgeschichte, vol. 5, p. 160 ff

Footnotes 

People from Gelnhausen
House of Wittelsbach
Counts Palatine of the Holy Roman Empire
Dukes of Germany
1697 births
1739 deaths
18th-century German people